Per Johan Sven Elf, (born May 8, 1975) is a Swedish biophysicist. As of 2013 he is professor of physical biology at Uppsala universitet, Department of Cell and Molecular Biology. He is a member of the board of Uppsala University.

He is a member of the Chemistry class at the Swedish Royal Academy of Sciences since 2016 and EMBO since 2022.

He  founded the company Astrego in 2017 and Bifrost Biosystems in 2022.
 
Elf studies dynamic processes in bacterial cells using sensitive optical methods and quantitative models. His main contributions is within the following categories: Genetic encoding, algorithms for spatially-dependent stochastic simulations, methods for single molecule tracking in living cells, mechanisms of molecular search kinetics  and antibiotic susceptibility testing.

References

External links 
 Lab website

Swedish biophysicists
1975 births
Living people